Perotrochus caledonicus is a species of large sea snail, a marine gastropod mollusk in the family Pleurotomariidae, the slit snails.

Description
The length of the shell varies between 30 mm and 55 mm.

Distribution
This marine species occurs off New Caledonia.

References

 Bouchet, P. & Métivier, B., 1982. Living Pleurotomariidae in the south Pacific. New Zealand Journal of Zoology 9: 309-318

External links
 To Encyclopedia of Life
 To World Register of Marine Species
 

Pleurotomariidae
Gastropods described in 1982